Sir Roger Appleton, 1st Baronet (died 16 January 1614), was an English landowner and baronet.

Appleton was the son of Henry Appleton of South Benfleet, Essex, and Faith Cardinal. He was educated at St John's College, Cambridge. He inherited his father's estates, including Jarvis Hall, in 1607. He was knighted by James I upon becoming High Sheriff of Essex in 1608. On 29 June 1611 he was made a Baronet, of South Bernfleet in the County of Essex, during the second round of creations by James I.

He married Anne, the daughter of Sir Thomas Mildmay, with whom he had two daughters and a son:
Sir Henry Appleton, 2nd Baronet (died 1649), married Joan, daughter of Edward Sheldon Esq.
Frances Appleton, married Francis Goldsmith 
Mary Appleton, married Thomas Hanley Esq.

References

Year of birth unknown
1614 deaths
17th-century English people
Baronets in the Baronetage of England
17th-century English landowners
High Sheriffs of Essex
Alumni of St John's College, Cambridge